Breaker Reef is an uninhabited island of Hong Kong which is part of Tai Po District, New Territories. It is located in Mirs Bay to the southwest of Shek Ngau Chau.

References

Uninhabited islands of Hong Kong
Tai Po District
Islands of Hong Kong